Kwiatkowski (feminine: Kwiatkowska ; plural: Kwiatkowscy ) is the 15th most common surname in Poland (66,917 people in 2009). It comes from place names such as Kwiatków, Kwiatkowo, or Kwiatkowice, which are derived from the Polish word kwiatek ("flower"). Associated with this surname are the Polish noble families bearing the seals of Drogomir, Gryf, Jastrzębiec, Korab, Nałęcz, Nowina, Rola, Strzemię, Wieruszowa, or Własne.

Related surnames

Notable people
 Anita Kwiatkowska, Polish volleyball player
 Barbara Kwiatkowska-Lass (1940–1995), Polish actress
 Bronisław Kwiatkowski (1950–2010), Polish military commander
 Eugeniusz Kwiatkowski (1888–1974), Polish politician and economist
 Grzegorz Kwiatkowski (born 1984), Polish poet and musician
 Halina Kwiatkowska (1921–2020), Polish actress
 Heinz Kwiatkowski (1926–2008), German football goalkeeper
 Henryk de Kwiatkowski (1924–2003), Polish-born aeronautical engineer and horse breeder
 Irena Kwiatkowska (1912–2011), Polish actress
 Joel Kwiatkowski (born 1977), Canadian ice hockey player
 Karen Kwiatkowski (born 1960), American Air Force officer and writer
 Krzysztof Kwiatkowski (born 1971), Polish politician
 Ladimir Kwiatkowski (1928–1994), American television personality
 Łukasz Kwiatkowski (1982–2018), Polish cyclist
 Marta Kwiatkowska (born 1957), Polish-British computer scientist
 Mirosława Jastrzębska née Kwiatkowska (1921 - 1982), Polish scientist, ethnographer, museum curator
 Michał Kwiatkowski (born 1983), Polish singer known as Michal in France
 Michał Kwiatkowski (born 1990), Polish cyclist
 Mickey Kwiatkowski (born 1947), American football coach
 Oskar Kwiatkowski (born 1996), Polish snowboarder
 Paloma Kwiatkowski (born 1994), Canadian actress
 Thai-Son Kwiatkowski (born 1995), American tennis player
 Teofil Kwiatkowski (1809–1891), Polish painter
 Tonia Kwiatkowski (born 1971), American figure skater
 Zbigniew Kwiatkowski (born 1985), Polish handballer
 Aleksandr Kvyatkovsky (1853–1880), Russian revolutionary
 Andriy Kviatkovskyi (born 1990), Ukrainian freestyle wrestler

See also
 
 
 Gryf coat of arms (Kwiatkowski, Kwiatkowicz, Kwiatkiewicz, Kwieciński)
 Kwiatków (disambiguation)
 Kwiatkowice (disambiguation)

References

Polish-language surnames